Andrea Stašková (born 12 May 2000) is a Czech professional footballer who plays as a striker for Spanish Liga F club Atlético Madrid and the Czech Republic women's national team.

Career
Stašková was voted talent of the year at the 2017 and 2018 Czech Footballer of the Year.

She was top scorer and was voted as a best player of the international indoor football tournament Turbine Hallencup 2018.

In the 2018–19 season, Stašková was top scorer of the Czech Women's First League with 32 goals.

Stašková was named 2021 and 2022 Czech Footballer of the Year (women). On 28 June 2022, she joined Atlético Madrid.

International goals

Honours 
Sparta Prague
 National Champion: Winner 2018, 2019
 Czech Women's Cup: Winner 2017, 2018, 2019
 Turbine Hallencup: Winner 2019

Juventus
 Serie A: 2019–20, 2020–21, 2021–22
 Coppa Italia: 
 Supercoppa Italiana: 2019, 2020–21, 2021–22

References 

2000 births
Living people
Czech women's footballers
Women's association football forwards
People from Znojmo
Czech Republic women's international footballers
Juventus F.C. (women) players
Expatriate women's footballers in Italy
Czech expatriate sportspeople in Italy
AC Sparta Praha (women) players
Serie A (women's football) players
Czech Women's First League players
Czech expatriate women's footballers
Sportspeople from the South Moravian Region
Atlético Madrid Femenino players
Czech expatriate sportspeople in Spain
Expatriate women's footballers in Spain